Yuriy Mykhaylovych Melashenko is a Soviet and Ukrainian retired football player who played as a goalkeeper.

Career
Yuriy Melashenko at the 17-year-old student, he became a player of Desna Chernihiv, the main club of the city of Chernihiv, where was born. Here he played three season and he in 1988 he took part of the Soviet Second League. In the 1991 season he became the main goalkeeper.

In 1994 he played 2 matches with FC Kryvbas Kryvyi Rih in Vyshcha Liha in the season 1994–95. From 1995 until 1999, he played for Bukovyna Chernivtsi. For 4 seasons he played on the field in 113 matches, becoming the medalist of the Ukrainian First League.

In 1999, he turned to Desna Chernihiv, where he played for 3 seasons. In total for Desna Chernihiv he played 203 matches (194 - in the championships of the USSR and Ukraine and 9 - in the Ukrainian Cup).

In the season 2002–03, he played in the Ukrainian First League for Spartak Ivano-Frankivsk and Sokil Zolochiv. In 2003 he moved to Navbahor Namangan an Uzbek football club based in Namangan, which he got 3rd place in the championship in Uzbekistan.

After Retirement
After the completion of the football career, he started his career as coach. In 2015, having cheated the team of the Chernihiv Collegium No. 11 at the Leather Ball tournament, where the team took 2nd place. From 2010 until 2013, he was a coach at the Yunist Chernihiv.

Personal life
His son Serhiy Melashenko is a football player, goalkeeper that played for the club Desna Chernihiv.

References

External links 
 Profile on Official website of FC Desna Chernihiv
 Yuriy Melashenko allplayers.in.ua
 
 

1970 births
Living people
Soviet footballers
Footballers from Chernihiv
Ukrainian footballers
Association football goalkeepers
SDYuShOR Desna players
FC Yunist Chernihiv managers
FC Desna Chernihiv players
FC Bukovyna Chernivtsi players
FC Kryvbas Kryvyi Rih players
FC Spartak Ivano-Frankivsk players
FC Sokil Zolochiv players
FC Kalush players
Navbahor Namangan players
Ukrainian Premier League players
Ukrainian First League players
Ukrainian Second League players
Ukrainian expatriate footballers
Expatriate footballers in Uzbekistan
Ukrainian expatriate sportspeople in Uzbekistan